NPO Lavochkin (OKB-301, also called Lavochkin Research and Production Association or shortly Lavochkin Association, LA) is a Russian aerospace company. It is a major player in the Russian space program, being the developer and manufacturer of the Fregat upper stage, as well as interplanetary probes such as Fobos-Grunt. As of 2015, it was headed by Sergei Lemeshevskii. On August 10, 2017 the Lavochkin Association's Board of Directors appointed Vladimir Kolmykov Director General of the enterprise.

Overview
The company develops and manufactures spacecraft such as the Fregat  rocket upper stages, satellites and interplanetary probes. It is a contractor for a number of military programs, such as the Oko early warning satellite, Prognoz and Araks programmes as well as the civilian program Kupon. One of the company's most notable projects was the participation in the failed Fobos-Grunt sample return mission. NPO Lavochkin has also developed the Elektro–L series of new-generation weather satellites, as well as the Navigator standardised satellite platform, which will serve as the basis for several future Russian satellites.

History
The company was founded in 1937 as OKB-301, a Soviet aircraft design bureau (OKB). On October, 1945 Lavochkin was promoted for the head designer of the design bureau. It gained distinction for its family of piston-engined fighter aircraft during World War II, and later shifted to missile and jet fighter designs. Following the death of the head designer, the OKB-301 succumbed to the growing power of Vladimir Chelomey and became OKB-52 Branch No. 3 on 18 December 1962. Later, it turned to work on interplanetary probe designs for Luna sample return program, the Lunokhod program, Vega program, Phobos program, etc. The former OKB-301 became named NPO Lavochkin.

In January 2012, officials of Lavochkin faced administrative punishment for not taking into account of designing the computer system after the crash of Russia's Mars moon spacecraft Fobos-Grunt.

Projects

Aircraft 

 LaGG-1
 LaGG-3
 Gu-82
 K-37
 Gu-1
 La-5
 La-7 "Fin"
 La-9 "Fritz"
 La-11 "Fang"
 La-15 "Fantail"
 La-17
 La-120
 La-126
 La-130
 La-132
 La-134
 La-138
 La-140
 La-150
 La-152
 La-154
 La-156
 La-160
 La-168
 La-174
 La-176
 La-180
 La-190
 La-200
 La-250 Anakonda

Rockets and missiles 
 S-25 Berkut (SA-1 "Guild") - surface-to-air missile
 S-75 Dvina (SA-2 "Guideline") - surface-to-air missile
 La-205 is V-300, a SAM for S-25 air defense system
 La-350 Burya - intercontinental cruise missile
 La-400 DAL - surface to air missile
 Fregat - upper stage

Spacecraft 

 Astron
 Elektro-L - satellite
 Elektro-L No.1
 Elektro-L No.2
 Fobos-Grunt - space probe
 Granat - satellite
Living Interplanetary Flight Experiment - space probe
Luna programme
Luna 9
Luna 10
Luna 11
Luna 12
Luna 13
Luna 14
Luna 15
Luna 16
Luna 17
Luna 18
Luna 19
Luna 20
Luna 21
Luna 22
Luna 23
Luna 24
Luna 25
Luna E-8 No.201
Luna E-8-5 No.402
Luna E-8-5 No.405
Luna E-8-5M No.412
Lunokhod programme
 Lunokhod 1
 Lunokhod 2
 Mars program
 Mars 2M No.521
 Mars 2M No.522
 Mars 4
 Mars 5
 Mars 5M
 Mars 6
 Mars 7
 Mars-96
 Oko - missile early warning satellite.
 Spektr-R - space radio telescope satellite, dedicated to very Long Baseline Interferometry
 Spektr-RG - space observatory satellite
 US-K - satellite
 US-KMO - satellite
 US-KS - satellite
 Venera program
 Venera 3
 Venera 4
 Venera 5
 Venera 7
 Venera 8
 Venera 9
 Kosmos 167
 Vega program
 Vega 1
 Vega 2

Future projects 
 Luna-Glob
 Mars-Grunt - space probe

Designers and engineers 
 Georgy Babakin
 Semyon Lavochkin
 Yuri Koptev, later director of Roscosmos, worked at Lavochkin from 1965

See also 

 Babakin Space Centre

References

Further reading 
 William H Mott, Robert B Sheldon, L Philip Sheldon (2000). Laser Satellite Communication: The Third Generation.  Greenwood Publishing Group. pp. 132. 
 GlobalSecurity.org - http://www.globalsecurity.org/space/world/russia/npolav.htm

 
Aircraft manufacturers of the Soviet Union
Aerospace companies of the Soviet Union
Soviet and Russian space institutions
Rocket engine manufacturers of Russia
Roscosmos divisions and subsidiaries
Companies based in Moscow Oblast
Russian brands
Design bureaus